The Pundits are an undergraduate senior secret society at Yale University in New Haven, Connecticut. It is one of the oldest societies at Yale, often referred to as the "fourth of the big three." The Pundits were founded in 1884 as a society of "campus wits," and have a tradition of rebelling against Yale tradition, often through elaborate pranks.

The society is known for hosting naked parties and socials, which the group moderates to make sure they remain safe spaces for the individuals attending. The nudity is described as an experiment in social interaction, and any sexual behavior is prohibited at the parties. The society is also known for allegedly organizing naked runs through the various libraries of Yale.

Founding and History 

The founder of the Pundits, as an undergraduate at Yale, was the illustrious William Lyon Phelps (1865-1943). Phelps went on to become essentially the leading humanities scholar in the United States in his day, and an enormously admired professor at Yale. Phelps was the original prototype of the star professor, whose lectures were considered so witty, so brilliant, and entertaining, that attendance at his course became known as a not-to-be-missed feature of the Yale undergraduate experience.

The Pundits doubtless did not originally hold naked parties, but contented themselves with assembling the wittiest and most brilliant members of the senior class for a weekly dinner, and participating in a series of elaborate pranks and lampoons intended to deflate pomposity and pretension among the student body.

The society has gained a reputation as "Yale's Merry Pranksters," and has been referred to as "the Antithesis of Skull of Bones." There is a rumor that they possess a secret island located between mainland Canada and the United States, which they use as a hide-out when fleeing the publicity caused by their pranks.  

The society accrued many names during its time, including "The United People's Front of La Pundita." Speculation exists that the contemporary use of the term "pundit" may have its origins with the Pundits, which developed a reputation for including among its members the school's most incisive and humorous critics of contemporary society. The group's late-nineteenth and early-twentieth century focus on lampooning the social and political world were well-documented in the university's yearbook and the Yale Daily News, the entries of which are considered among the first use of the term "pundit" to refer to a critic of or expert on contemporary matters.

The Pundits select new members among Yale's students every spring, outside of Yale University's normal senior "Tap Day" process. The society values diversity and respect in recruiting its new membership, selecting students who it believes embody its values of love, affection, humor, political commentary, nudity, absurdity, and body positivity.

Alumni 
Several members of the society have also gone on to become leading political pundits, including Pulitzer Prize-winning author and energy expert Daniel Yergin, and the 68th United States Secretary of State John Kerry. Other notable Yale Pundits include Alfred Whitney Griswold, Lewis H. Lapham and Joe Lieberman.

References 

Secret societies at Yale